Angelo Michele Colonna (21 September 1604 - 1687) was an Italian painter of the Baroque period, active in Bologna, northern and central Italy and Spain. He is sometimes referred to as Michelangelo Colonna.

Biography

He was born in Rovenna. As a boy in Como, he worked with a painter by the name of Caprera. By 1617, he travelled to Bologna to apprentice with Gabriello Ferrantino or il Occhiale, and then the early quadratura master, Girolamo Curti, called il Dentone.

He painted frescoes for the Palazzo Albergati in Bologna. He would have been known by the biographer of Bolognese artists, Cesare Malvasia, for whom Colonna frescoed the Villa Malvasia in Trebbo in 1624, along with Curti and Domenico Ambrogi. The following year, Curti and Colonna frescoed parts of the Villa Paleotti (now Villa Monari-Sardè). Also in 1625, along with Ambrogi, he carried out frescoes in the Villa Malvezzi-Campeggi in Bagnarola and after being recommended by Alessandro Tiarini, he helped to decorate the ceiling of the church of Sant'Alessandro in Parma. In 1625, he collaborated with Lucio Massari, Francesco Gessi and others in the decoration of the Oratory of San Rocco in Bologna, painting six of the saints and allegories. In 1627, he painted in San Michele in Bosco.

After Curti died in 1632, Colonna began a long collaboration with the skilled quadratura painter Agostino Mitelli until 1660. Together they contributed to the decorations of the Palazzo Spada in Rome, and then painted in the Pitti Palace in Florence, including a large fresco of the 'Fame of the Medici crowned by Glory'.

They became the pre-eminent quadratura fresco painters of northern Italy with Colonna principally executing the figurative elements and Mitelli, the quadratura or illusionistic architectural frameworks: in Modena, they painted in the Este palace at Sassuolo; they executed the ceiling of the now destroyed Oratorio de San Girolamo of Rimini; in 1657 they carried out the decoration of the chapel of the Rosary in the basilica of San Domenico in Bologna, including a framed 'Assumption of the Virgin'; and between 1653-8, they painted the gallery leading to the High Altar of San Michele in Bosco.

In 1658, Colonna left Italy to go to Spain to work for Philip IV of Spain; he had initially been contracted for this work by Diego Velázquez. He was to return to Italy in 1662, where his collaborator now was Mitelli's pupil, Giacomo Alboresi (1632–1677). He continued to be prolific in Bologna, decorating the Palazzo Cospi-Ferreti, Bologna and a chapel in the church of San Bartolomeo (1667). In 1677, he completed frescoes for the Council Hall of the Palazzo Comunale or town hall of Bologna, working with Gioacchino Pizzoli. Giuseppe Romani was one of his apprentices.

Colonna died at Bologna in 1687.

References

Sources

Anales de Historia del Arte  1998. 8:197-222; Angelo Michele Colonna: sus aportaciones à la pintura barroca decorativa en Italia by Aida Anguiano de Miguel.

External links
 Biography in Italian.

1604 births
1687 deaths
People from the Province of Como
17th-century Italian painters
Italian male painters
Painters from Bologna
Italian Baroque painters
Quadratura painters